Seán Crummey (born 1957 – died 13 November 2011) was a Belfast playwright, actor and comic impressionist who is most notable as both the writer and the male voice-over star of The Folks on the Hill, a hugely successful, popular programme that started in 2001 and ran for over 10 years with a total of seventeen radio and animated television series. The show is considered by many to be one of BBC NI's most successful programmes due to its longevity and popularity.

Biography
Crummey was born and grew up in the Glen Road district of West Belfast.  He attended St. Kevin's Primary School and then St Malachy's College before proceeding to Queen's University Belfast from which he graduated in 1980 with a BA in French and Classical Greek. He taught French language for seventeen years at De La Salle College, Belfast.

Comic career
He worked the after-dinner comic entertainment circuit for many years, and he felt that his language background contributed to his voice-over impressions. During the Troubles, comedians needed to adopt a non-partisan stance, so his stage name was a neutral-sounding non-Catholic pseudonym.

Seán Crummey was well known for his hilariously accurate depictions and his gentle, humorous political satire. He impersonated dozens of voices, particularly of Northern Ireland politicians. Some of Crummey's favourite voices to impersonate were the late PUP leader David Ervine, Pope John Paul II, and Bill McLaren.

He also wrote and starred in Stormont, a stage play produced by Martin Lynch and directed by Michael Poynor, that ran at the Theatre at the Mill in Newtownabbey mid-September to early October 2010 selling out many nights of the show's run. On stage, Crummey alternately mimicked two politicians, Ulster Unionist Michael McGimpsey and Sinn Féin's Gerry Kelly.

He died from a cancer-related illness just a day after his final show was broadcast. Politicians from across the political spectrum gave respectful tribute to his comic genius, penetrating humour, and talented political commentary. His funeral was attended by thousands and an unusually large number of famous individuals from all walks of life.

A tribute show was broadcast on New Year's Day, 2012. A memorial fund set up in memory of Seán Crummey donated £60,000 to Queen's Centre for Cancer Research and Cell Biology (CCRCB).

References

External links
 Tribute to Sean Crummey. John Linehan, known to many as May McFettridge, on The Nolan Show, 14 November 2011 (audioBoo) 

1957 births
Male comedians from Northern Ireland
Irish impressionists (entertainers)
Male radio actors from Northern Ireland
Irish male dramatists and playwrights
Male voice actors from Northern Ireland
Male actors from Belfast
2011 deaths
Alumni of Queen's University Belfast
20th-century Irish dramatists and playwrights
20th-century male writers
Satirists from Northern Ireland
Comedy writers from Northern Ireland
Humorists from Northern Ireland
Television writers from Northern Ireland
Comedians from Belfast
British male television writers
20th-century comedians from Northern Ireland
21st-century comedians from Northern Ireland